Leong Fee (Hakka Pha̍k-fa-sṳ: Liòng Fî) is the Hakka name for Liang Pi Joo (1857–1912), a worker from Guangdong in China who emigrated to Malaya in 1876.

Career
He arrived in Penang and, half a year later, moved to Perak where he began to make his fortune in tin. He was a tin miner, businessman, a visiting Justice for Kinta (1892), the first Chinese Member of the Federal Legislative Council (1909) a Penang state senator, a member of the Perak State Council, a Chinese Vice-Consul to Penang (1902 to 1908) and a philanthropist. He was a member of the Society for the Encouragement of Arts, Manufactures and Commerce.

In 1902 he opened a mine in Tambun. Renowned Malaysian businessman Leong Sin Nam once worked in his tin mine. One year later Tambun held the world record for tin production.

Leong Fee Mansion
Built on Leith Street around the 1900s as a personal residence, it now belongs to the Christian Brothers and has been leased to an art school, Akademi Seni Equator.

Hakka Chinese Tin Miners Club
Leong Fee founded the club in Ipoh in 1893. His son, Leong Yin Khean alias Liang En-Chuen, continued to sponsor the lodge after his father's death in 1912 and eventually sold the house cheaply to the club. He was a member of the Society for the Encouragement of Arts, Manufactures and Commerce.

Personal life
He married the daughter of millionaire-philanthropist Hsieh Yung-kuan, the Chinese Vice-Consul to Penang before him.

References

1857 births
1911 deaths
Businesspeople from Meizhou
Malaysian businesspeople
People from Meixian District
Malaysian politicians of Hakka descent